Václav Vaško (26 April 1921 – 20 May 2009) was a Czech diplomat, human rights activist, author of books dealing with the history of the Catholic Church during the Soviet occupation and communist dictatorship, and a former political prisoner of the communist regime.

He was awarded the Medal of Merit by President Václav Havel on 28 October 1998. He was a founding signatory of the Prague Declaration on European Conscience and Communism.

Works 
 Neumlčená (a chronicle of the Catholic Church in Czechoslovakia during the communist dictatorship, written in the 1980s, published in 1990 in two volumes)
 Kardinál Tomášek (1994, co-authored with Jan Hartmann, Bohumil Svoboda et al.)
 Ne vším jsem byl rád (1999, 2001)
 Dům na skále
 Církev zkoušená (2004)
 Církev bojující (2007)
 Církev vězněná (2008)
 Likvidace řeckokatolické církve (2007)

References

Czechoslovak democracy activists
Czech human rights activists
1921 births
2009 deaths